Ángel Serafín Seriche Dougan (born 1946) was Prime Minister of Equatorial Guinea from April 1, 1996 to March 4, 2001.

Beginning in 2000, Dougan's government was subjected to serious criticism from the parliamentary majority with regard to allegations of corruption. This led to what was described as an "institutional crisis", and Dougan resigned on February 23, 2001. President Teodoro Obiang Nguema appointed Cándido Muatetema Rivas to succeed him on February 26.

References

1946 births
Living people
Members of the Chamber of Deputies (Equatorial Guinea)
Prime Ministers of Equatorial Guinea
Democratic Party of Equatorial Guinea politicians
People of Bubi descent